Miller Township is a township in Gentry County, in the U.S. state of Missouri.

Miller Township has the name of Isaac Miller, an early settler.

References

Townships in Missouri
Townships in Gentry County, Missouri